Three ships of the British Royal Navy have been named HMS Observer:

 , a sloop of 10 guns, was the Massachusetts privateer Amsterdam, which  captured on 19 October 1781. Observer was sold on 21 October 1784.
 , an  launched in 1916 and sold in 1921.
 HMS Observer, an O-class destroyer renamed whilst under construction to HMS Oribi (G66) and launched in 1941. The ship was transferred to Turkey in 1946 and broken up in 1965.

See also
 HMS Observateur, a French brig launched at Le Havre in 1800, captured in 1806 and sold in 1814.

Citations

References
 

Royal Navy ship names